Walter William Read (born 23 November 1855 in Reigate, Surrey, died 6 January 1907 in Addiscombe Park, Surrey) was an English cricketer. A fluent right hand bat, he was also an occasional bowler of lobs who sometimes switched to quick overarm deliveries. He captained England in two Test matches, winning them both. Read was named a Wisden Cricketer of the Year in 1893.

Cricket career
Read took part in the original Ashes series of 1882–3 and is commemorated by the poem inscribed on the side of the urn:

When Ivo goes back with the urn, the urn;
Studds, Steel, Read and Tylecote return, return;
The welkin will ring loud,
The great crowd will feel proud,
Seeing Barlow and Bates with the urn, the urn;
And the rest coming home with the urn.

He played for Surrey from 1873 to 1897, scoring 338 for them against Oxford University in 1888. At the time, it was the second highest first-class score ever made. He was a member of the side that won the County Championship in 1890-2, 1894 and 1895. After W. G. Grace he was the most prolific amateur of his day.

He became the first number 10 to score a hundred in Test cricket when he made 117 against Australia at The Oval in 1884. His match-saving innings remains the highest score by a No. 10 in Tests. He reached his century in 113 minutes with 36 scoring strokes. His partnership of 151 with William Scotton remains England's highest for the ninth wicket against Australia. According to Sir Home Gordon, Read was furious at being held down so low in the order.

See also

History of Test cricket (to 1883)
History of Test cricket (1884 to 1889)
History of Test cricket (1890 to 1900)

References

Further reading
Keith Booth, Walter Read: A Class Act, ACS Publications, 2011, .

External links
 CricketArchive page on Walter Read
 Annals of Cricket by W. W. Read (1896) at Internet Archive

1855 births
1907 deaths
England Test cricketers
England Test cricket captains
English cricketers
Surrey cricketers
Marylebone Cricket Club cricketers
Gentlemen cricketers
North v South cricketers
Wisden Cricketers of the Year
People from Reigate
Gentlemen of the South cricketers
East of England cricketers
Gentlemen of England cricketers
C. I. Thornton's XI cricketers
Lyric Club cricketers
Lord Londesborough's XI cricketers